Zurab Aragvis Eristavi, also known as Sohrab Aragvis Eristavi (b. 1591 — d. 1629), was a Georgian duke (eristavi) of the Duchy of Aragvi (1619—1629), who initially served the Safavids, and played a leading role in Georgian politics in the first decades of the 17th century. Later, he joined Giorgi Saakadze's (Murav Beg) anti-Persian uprising in 1625–26, switched sides to join Teimuraz I of Kakheti (Tahmuras Khan) against Saakadze, but was eventually murdered by his new ally.

Biography
Zurab Eristavi was amongst the highest ranking Georgian nobles at the time. He was the son of Nugzar I (1600-1611) and had one older brother named Baadur (Bahadur). In 1619, with the help of the Safavid troops and the Safavid-appointed ruler in Tiflis, Semayun Khan (Simon II), Zurab managed to drive his elder brother Bahadur out of Bazaleti. Receiving further aid from them, he started to conduct raids against the people of Mtiuleti and the Khevi; he managed to submit these countries, and became notoriously powerful. Through the marriage of his daughter to Giorgi Saakadze, Saakadze had become the son-in-law of Zurab Eristavi. Zurab himself was the son-in-law of Teimuraz I, through his marriage to Darejan in 1623. When in 1624 Safavid king Abbas I (r. 1588–1629) decided to marry his granddaughter to Semayun Khan, the Safavid ruler of Kartli, Sohrab Eristavi and Abd-ol-Ghaffar Amilakhori entertained the guests in the third term of the wedding party on the order of Murav Beg. During the Battle of Martqopi, Zurab and Giorgi Saakadze led the Georgian troops. Zurab led a charge with his main forces after Qarachaqay Khan and the other Safavid Iranian commanders had been killed by Saakadze and his son Avtandil (supported by his Georgian escorts), which resulted in the virtual annihilation of the leaderless Iranian troops. When in the summer of 1626 the final "rupture" between Teimuraz I and Giorgi Saakadze occurred, Zurab Eristavi joined the side of the Teimuraz. However, in 1630 Zurab was killed on the orders of Teimuraz I, shortly after the king had instigated the duke to murder the Safavid-sponsored ruler of Kartli, Semayun Khan. Zurab was succeeded as duke (eristavi) of Aragvi by his younger brother, known by his dynastic name of David I.

References

Sources
 
 
 
 
 
 

1591 births
1629 deaths
16th-century people from Georgia (country)
17th-century people from Georgia (country)
17th-century people of Safavid Iran
Nobility of Georgia (country)